Bequia United Football Club is a Vincentian football club from Port Elizabeth, Saint Vincent and the Grenadines. The club plays in the NLA Premier League, the highest tier of football in Saint Vincent and the Grenadines.

Roster

References

Managerial history 
Kendale_Mercury

External links 
Facebook page

Football clubs in Saint Vincent and the Grenadines
2012 establishments in Saint Vincent and the Grenadines